Pryvillia is a city in Lysychansk Municipality, Luhansk Oblast (region) of Ukraine. Population: .

History 
On 7 May 2022, Russian forces shelled the city during the 2022 Russian invasion of Ukraine. Two teenage boys, aged 11 and 14 respectively, were killed. Russian forces crossed the Siverskyi Donets river and captured the city sometime between 28 June and 1 July.

In the beginning of August, the Bellingcat group reported that the earlier published videos of mutilation and subsequent murder of an unidentified Ukrainian soldier by Russian paramilitaries were geolocated to the Pryvillia Sanatorium, located in Pryvillia.

Demographics 
Native language as of the Ukrainian Census of 2001:
Russian  78.7%
Ukrainian  20.7%
Belarusian  0.2%
Armenian  0.1%

References 

Cities in Luhansk Oblast
Yekaterinoslav Governorate
Cities of district significance in Ukraine